245th Aviation Regiment is an Aviation regiment of the United States Army.

Structure

 1st Battalion (Airfield Operations)
 2nd Battalion (Fixed Wing) 
 Headquarters and Headquarters Company (OK ARNG)
 Company A (-) flying a C-12 at Army Aviation Support Facility, Quonset State Airport (RI ARNG) former Det.23 OSACOM
 Detachment 2 flying a C-26 at Army Aviation Support Facility, Robinson Army Airfield (AR ARNG) former Det.30 OSACOM
Detachment 3 flying a C-12 at Army Aviation Support Facility, Mather Army Airfield (CA ARNG) former Det. 32 OSACOM
 Detachment 5 flying a C-12 at Army Aviation Support Facility #1, Decatur Airport (IL ARNG) former Det.36 OSACOM
 Detachment 6 flying a C-12T-3 at Army Aviation Support Facility, Santa Fe Regional Airport (NM ARNG) former Det.44 OSACOM
 Detachment 7 flying a C-12T-3 and flying a C-12V at Army Aviation Support Facility #1, Gray Army Airfield (WA ARNG) former Det.51 OSACOM
 Company B (-) flying a C-26 at Army Aviation Support Facility #2, Dobbins Air Reserve Base (GA ARNG) former Det.9 OSACOM
 Detachment 1 flying a C-12T-2, Northeast Florida Regional Airport (FL ARNG) former Det.8 OSACOM
 Detachment 3 flying a C-12T-3 at Army Aviation Support Facility #2, Indianapolis International Airport (IN ARNG) former Det.10 OSACOM
 Detachment 6 at Army Aviation Support Facility, Cheyenne Regional Airport (WY ARNG) former Det.53 OSACOM
 Detachment 7 flying a C-12U-2 at Army Aviation Support Facility, Helena Regional Airport (MT ARNG) former Det.41 OSACOM
 Company C (-) flying a C-12, Will Rogers Air National Guard Base (OK ARNG) former Det.46 OSACOM
 Detachment 1 at Army Aviation Support Facility #1, Richmond International Airport (VA ARNG) former Det.26 OSACOM
 Detachment 2 at Army Aviation Support Facility, Jefferson City Memorial Airport (MO ARNG) former Det.40 OSACOM
 Detachment 3 at Army Aviation Support Facility, Boise Airport (ID ARNG) former Det.35 OSACOM
 Detachment 4 at Army Aviation Support Facility, Capital City Airport (Kentucky) (KY ARNG) former Det.11 OSACOM
 Detachment 5 at Army Aviation Support Facility #3, Albany International Airport (NY ARNG) former Det.20 OSACOM
 Detachment 6 at Army Aviation Support Facility #1, Buckley Space Force Base (CO ARNG) former Det.33 OSACOM
 Detachment 7 at Army Aviation Support Facility #1, Bismarck Municipal Airport (ND ARNG) former Det.42 OSACOM

References

Aviation regiments of the United States Army
Military units and formations established in 1987